This is a list of songs released and unreleased by English band Keane.

Original songs

Cover songs

"Do They Know It's Christmas?" (Band Aid 20, Chaplin and Rice-Oxley's contribution)
"Early Winter" (co-written for Gwen Stefani)
"Goodbye Yellow Brick Road" (Elton John, included on Help: a Day in the Life)
"Go Your Own Way" (Fleetwood Mac, Live on BBC Radio 2, May 2010)
"Karma Chameleon" (Culture Club, live April 2009 + Pete Doherty)
"Cast No Shadow" (Oasis, V Festival 2009)
"The Downtown Lights" (The Blue Nile, MSN Music Something Sessions, 2012)

Featured songs on massive media

Covers of Keane songs by other artists
"Bedshaped" - Marillion, Vittorio Grigolo (as "Cosi")
"Closer Now" renamed 'Pattern of my Life'- Annie Lennox 
"Everybody's Changing" - Lily Allen, Taio Cruz, Martin Stenmarck, Katy Perry, FunFiction, Kate Miller
"Somewhere Only We Know" - Natasha Bedingfield, Max Schneider with Elizabeth Gilles, Elsa Roses, Stacey Solomon, Saint Patrick's Junior Choir, Luke Friend, Luis Sequira, Michael Paynter, Laura Michelle Kelly, Lifehouse, Travis (as "After Mark and Lard Go"), Lily Allen, Renee Dominique, Kacey Musgraves,  Glee, Sam Clark, Jordan JAE, Saint Ronan's, Reese Lansangan , Karina Maisha, Post Modern Jukebox, Yaval Salomon, Kacey Musgraves live w/ Tom Chaplin, SimplyThree, Collabro, Those Guys A cappella
"Spiralling" - Sugababes, Hayley Kiyoko 
"Bend and Break" - Maddy and Girls, Maddy Prior, Abby Lathe, Claudia Gibson, Noah
"Better Than This" - VIDAR
"This Is The Last Time" - ortoPilot, SIDEPONY, Tessa Looijen
"You Are Young" - Madyon
"We Might As Well Be Strangers" - Marcos French
"Is It Any Wonder?" - Passenger , Fritts

Notes

 
Keane
Keane